Khvajeh Mohammad-Sharif was a Persian statesman, who occupied the post of vizier of several Safavid provinces. He was also a poet, who wrote under the pen name Hejri.

Biography 
Mohammad-Sharif was a native of Tehran—his brother Khvajeh Mirza Ahmad, had been appointed the mayor (kalantar) of Ray by Shah Tahmasp I (r. 1524–1576). After the death of his father, Mohammad-Sharif left for Khorasan, where he served as the vizier of Mohammad Khan Tekkelu and his son Tatar Soltan, who was the governor of the Safavid province of Khorasan. Mohammad-Sharif was later listed under the service of Shah Tahmasp I, where he in the start served as the vizier of Yazd, Abarkuh, and Biabanak for seven years. Thereafter he was appointed as the vizier of Isfahan, one of the most prominent offices in the area. There he became known for his rational approach to its inhabitants and for his skillful ability to resolve frictions. He died there in 1576/7. He was married to a daughter of Aqa Mulla Dawatdar. After his death, his youngest son Mirza Ghiyas Beg fell into disgrace for unknown reasons, and thus chose to relocate to Mughal India, where he became a high-ranking statesman, and eventually the chief minister of Emperor Jahangir (r. 1605–1627). Another son of Mohammad-Sharif, Mohammad-Taher Wasli, was a learned man who composed poetry under the pen name of Wasli.

Notes

References

Sources

Further reading 

16th-century Iranian politicians
1576 deaths
16th-century births
Safavid civil servants
Politicians from Tehran
16th-century writers of Safavid Iran
16th-century Persian-language poets
16th-century Iranian writers